Nedrevatnet or Nervatnet is a lake that lies in Fauske Municipality in Nordland county, Norway.  The  lake lies just east of the town of Fauske.  The lake Øvrevatnet flows into this lake and the water flows out of the Nedrevatnet into the Skjerstad Fjord.  The E6 highway and the Nordland Line run along the western edge of this lake.

See also
 List of lakes in Norway
 Geography of Norway

References

Lakes of Nordland
Fauske